Temnopteryx may refer to:
 Temnopteryx (cockroach)
 Temnopteryx (plant)